

Sovereign states

A
Afghanistan – Emirate of Afghanistan
 →  Andorra – Principality of Andorra
 Anhalt – Duchy of Anhalt 
 Anhalt-Bernburg – Duchy of Anhalt-Bernburg 
 Anhalt-Dessau – Duchy of Anhalt-Dessau 
 Ankole – Kingdom of Ankole
 Annam – Empire of Annam
Anziku – Anziku Kingdom
 → 
Argentine Confederation 
Argentine Republic 
 Aro – Aro Confederacy
 – Asante Union
 →  Austria / Austria-Hungary
Austrian Empire 
Austro-Hungarian Empire

B
 – Grand Duchy of Baden
Baguirmi – Kingdom of Baguirmi
Bambara – Bambara Empire
Baol – Kingdom of Baol
Basutoland – Kingdom of Basutoland 
 – Kingdom of Bavaria
 – Kingdom of Belgium
 – Benin Empire
Bhutan – Kingdom of Bhutan
 – Bolivian Republic
 Bora Bora – Kingdom of Bora Bora
Bornu – Bornu Empire
 – Empire of Brazil
 – Free Hanseatic City of Bremen 
 – Sultanate of Brunei
 – Duchy of Brunswick 
 Buganda – Kingdom of Buganda
 Bukhara – Emirate of Bukhara
 Bunyoro – Kingdom of Bunyoro-Kitara
 Burma – Kingdom of Burma
Burundi – Kingdom of Burundi

C
 Cambodia – Kingdom of Cambodia 
 →  Canada – Dominion of Canada 
Cayor – Kingdom of Cayor
 Central Italy – United Provinces of Central Italy 
 – Republic of Chile
 – Great Qing
 Colombia – United States of Colombia 

 – Republic of Costa Rica
 Couto Misto

D
Dahomey – Kingdom of Dahomey
 – Kingdom of Denmark
 →   – Dominican Republic

E
 →  – Republic of Ecuador
 →  →  El Salvador – El Salvador
 – Ethiopian Empire

F
Fante – Fante Confederacy 
Fiji – Tui Viti
 France – Empire of the French
 Frankfurt – Free City of Frankfurt 
Futa Jallon – Imamate of Futa Jallon
Futa Toro – Imamate of Futa Toro

G
Garo – Kingdom of Garo
Gera – Kingdom of Gera
Gomma – Kingdom of Gomma
 Granadine Confederation – Granadine Confederation (renamed New Granada on July 18, 1861)
 Greece – Kingdom of Greece
 Guatemala – Republic of Guatemala
Gumma – Kingdom of Gumma

H
 Ha'il – Emirate of Ha'il
 – Republic of Haiti
 – Free City of Hamburg 
 – Kingdom of Hanover 
 – Kingdom of Hawaii
 Hesse-Darmstadt – Grand Duchy of Hesse and by Rhine
 Hesse-Homburg – Landgraviate of Hesse-Homburg 
 Hesse-Kassel (or Hesse-Cassel) – Electorate of Hesse 
 Holstein – Duchy of Holstein 
 →  – Republic of Honduras
 Huahine – Kingdom of Huahine

I
 Ionian Islands – United States of the Ionian Islands
 Italy – Kingdom of Italy

J
Janjero – Kingdom of Janjero
 Japan
Tokugawa shogunate 
Empire of Japan 
Jimma – Kingdom of Jimma
 Johor – Sultanate of Johor
 – Jolof Kingdom

K
Kaabu – Kingdom of Kaabu 
Kabulistan – Kingdom of Kabul
Kaffa – Kingdom of Kaffa
 Kashgaria – Kingdom of Kashgaria 
Kénédougou – Kénédougou Kingdom
Khasso – Kingdom of Khasso
 Khiva – Khanate of Khiva
Kokand – Khanate of Kokand
Kong – Kong Empire
 Kongo – Kingdom of Kongo
 Korea – Kingdom of Great Joseon
Koya Temne – Kingdom of Koya

L
 – Republic of Liberia
 – Principality of Liechtenstein
 Limburg – Duchy of Limburg 
Limmu-Ennarea – Kingdom of Limmu-Ennarea
 Lippe – Principality of Lippe 
Loango – Kingdom of Loango
Luba – Luba Empire
 Lübeck – Free City of Lübeck (Lubeck) 
Lunda – Lunda Empire
 – Grand Duchy of Luxembourg

M
 Maldives – Sultanate of Maldives
Manipur – Kingdom of Manipur
Massina – Massina Empire 
Matabeleland – Matabele Kingdom
 Mecklenburg-Schwerin – Grand Duchy of Mecklenburg-Schwerin 
 Mecklenburg-Strelitz – Grand Duchy of Mecklenburg-Strelitz 
 →  → 
Republic of Mexico 
Mexican Empire 
United Mexican States 
Mindanao – Sultanate of Maguindanao
 – Principality of Monaco
 Montenegro – Principality of Montenegro
 – Sultanate of Morocco
 Muscat and Oman – Sultanate of Muscat and Oman

N
 Nassau – Duchy of Nassau 
 Negeri Sembilan – Negeri Sembilan
 Nepal - Kingdom of Nepal
 – Kingdom of The Netherlands
 New Granada – United States of New Granada 
 Nicaragua – Republic of Nicaragua
 North German Confederation – North German Confederation 
 Norway – Kingdom of Norway (in personal union with Sweden)

O
 Oldenburg – Grand Duchy of Oldenburg 
 – Republic of Orange Free State
 – Sublime Ottoman State
Ouaddai – Ouaddai Empire
Oyo – Oyo Empire

P
 Pahang – Sultanate of Pahang
 – States of the Church
 – Republic of Paraguay
 Perak – Sultanate of Perak
 Persia – Persian Empire
 – Peruvian Republic
 Portugal – Kingdom of Portugal
 – Kingdom of Prussia

R
 Raiatea – Kingdom of Raiatea
Rapa Nui – Kingdom of Rapa Nui
 Rarotonga – Kingdom of Rarotonga
 Reuss Elder Line – Principality of Reuss Elder Line 
 Reuss Junior Line – Principality of Reuss Junior Line 
 Romania - United Principalities of Moldavia and Wallachia 
 – Russian Empire
Rwanda – Kingdom of Rwanda
 – Kingdom of Ryūkyū

S
Samoa – Kingdom of Samoa
 →  – Most Serene Republic of San Marino
 – Kingdom of Sarawak
 – Kingdom of Sardinia 
 Saxe-Altenburg – Duchy of Saxe-Altenburg 
 Saxe-Coburg-Gotha – Duchy of Saxe-Coburg and Gotha 
 Saxe-Lauenburg – Duchy of Saxe-Lauenburg, also Duchy of Lauenburg
 Saxe-Meiningen – Duchy of Saxe-Meiningen 
 Saxe-Weimar-Eisenach – Grand Duchy of Saxe-Weimar-Eisenach 
 Saxony – Kingdom of Saxony 
 Schaumburg-Lippe – Principality of Schaumburg-Lippe 
 Schleswig – Duchy of Schleswig 
 Schwarzburg-Rudolstadt – Principality of Schwarzburg-Rudolstadt 
 Schwarzburg-Sondershausen – Principality of Schwarzburg-Sondershausen 
 Selangor – Sultanate of Selangor
 Serbia – Principality of Serbia
 – Kingdom of Siam
Sikkim – Chogyalate of Sikkim
 Sokoto – Sokoto Caliphate
 – Kingdom of Spain
 Sulu – Sultanate of Sulu
 – Kingdom of Sweden (in personal union with Norway)
 – Swiss Confederation

T
 Tahiti – Kingdom of Tahiti
Tonga – Tu'i Tonga
 Toro – Toro Kingdom
Toucouleur – Toucouleur Empire
 – South African Republic
 →  – Kingdom of the Two Sicilies

U
 – United Kingdom of Great Britain and Ireland
 →  →  →  →  – United States of America
 – Eastern Republic of Uruguay

V
 → 
Republic of Venezuela 
United States of Venezuela

W
 Waldeck-Pyrmont – Principality of Waldeck and Pyrmont 
Welayta – Kingdom of Welayta
 – Kingdom of Württemberg

Y
Yeke – Yeke Kingdom

Z
 – Sultanate of Zanzibar 
Zululand – Kingdom of the Zulus

Non-sovereign territories

United Kingdom
 – Cape of Good Hope

States claiming sovereignty
 Aceh – Sultanate of Aceh
 Alabama – Republic of Alabama (from January 11 to February 4, 1861)
 Araucanía and Patagonia – Kingdom of Araucanía and Patagonia (from November 17, 1860)
Arkansas – Republic of Arkansas (from May 6 to May 18, 1861)
 Buenos Aires – State of Buenos Aires
 →  →  →  →  →  – Confederate States of America (from February 4, 1861 to May 5, 1865)
 Cuba – Republic of Cuba (from October 10, 1868)
Ezo – Republic of Ezo (from December 15, 1868 to June 27, 1869)
 Florida – Republic of Florida (from January 10 to February 4, 1861)
Goust – Republic of Goust
 Louisiana – Republic of Louisiana (from January 26 to February 4, 1861)
 Mindanao – Sultanate of Maguindanao
 – Republic of Manitobah (from June 1867 to 1868)
 – Republic of Mississippi (from January 9 to February 1, 1861)
 North Carolina – Republic of North Carolina (from May 20 to May 21, 1861)
 Polish-Lithuanian-Ruthenian Commonwealth (from January 22, 1863 to June 18, 1864)
 →  South Carolina – Republic of South Carolina (from December 20, 1860 to February 8, 1861)
Taiping Heavenly Kingdom - Heavenly Kingdom of Great Peace (to July 1864)
 Tennessee - Republic of Tennessee (from June 8 to July 2, 1861)
 Tavolara – Kingdom of Tavolara
 Texas – Republic of Texas (from February 1 to March 2, 1861)
 Virginia – Republic of Virginia (from April 17 to May 7, 1861)

State